Doug Cerrito (born November 1970) is an American musician best known as the former guitarist for New York death metal band Suffocation from 1990 until their split in 1998.

He also played on death metal band Hate Eternal's debut Conquering the Throne, though he left the band shortly afterwards. He also played on the Paranoid Delusion EP by the band Welt. Cerrito declined to rejoin Suffocation in 2002.

References 

1969 births
21st-century American engineers
American heavy metal guitarists
American male guitarists
Death metal musicians
Living people
Rhythm guitarists
20th-century American guitarists
Suffocation (band) members
20th-century American male musicians
American people of Italian descent